The RCA 501 was a transistor computer manufactured by RCA beginning in 1958.

History
RCA's pioneering work in transistors in other products provided its engineers with the basis needed to design effective use of transistors in early solid-state electronic computer systems as well.  After three years of development, RCA introduced by 1959 the all-transistor RCA 501, a medium- to large-scale computer which  according to the sales brochures   was "the world's most advanced electronic data processing system". It was designed by industrial designer John Vassos, who employed a modular design strategy, framing the computer and its components as a system and not as individual units. He also used color coding to assist the operator to run the machine in an "orderly and fully controlled manner" according to the advertisement.

The Air Force purchased a 501 system in 1959 for $121,698.  Other customers included the Navy, Army, State Farm Life Insurance, and General Tire and Rubber Company.

A compatible version of the RCA 501 was sold by English Electric as their model KDP10/KDF8.

Features

The RCA 501 utilized advanced manufacturing techniques such as pluggable card units or printed circuit boards.  It also included a centralized operating console, from which the operator could control all aspects of the computer from one location, including starting and stopping of programs. It also used high-speed magnetic-core memory, expandable from 16k to 260k characters.  An optional drum memory unit could provide up to 1.5 million characters of storage, and up to 63 magnetic tape units could be installed.  The tape drives utilized variable length records, whereby the "data on [the] tape [is] in proportion to the length of the data in each entry."

See also
 List of transistorized computers
 History of computing hardware

References

1950s computers